Caragh Lake, also Lough Caragh, is a lake in the Reeks District in County Kerry, Ireland. The lake was formed by the damming of the Caragh River.

Caragh Lake railway station was on the Great Southern and Western Railway line which ran from Farranfore to Valentia Harbour.

Ecology
The lake is included within a large Special Area of Conservation: Killarney National Park, Macgillycuddy's Reeks and Caragh River Catchment SAC. The rare Kerry slug was first discovered near this lake. The lake is glacial in origin.

See also
Caragh River

References

Lakes of County Kerry